Helvetia semialba is a species of jumping spiders only found in Brazil.

References
  (2008): The world spider catalog, version 9.0. American Museum of Natural History.

Salticidae
Spiders of Brazil
Spiders described in 1901